The 4th World Sports Acrobatics Championships were held in Poznań, Poland, in 1980.

Men's Tumbling

Overall

First Exercise

Second Exercise

Men's Group

Overall

First Exercise

Second Exercise

Men's Pair

Overall

First Exercise

Second Exercise

Mixed Pair

Overall

First Exercise

Second Exercise

Women's Tumbling

Overall

First Exercise

Second Exercise

Women's Group

Overall

First Exercise

Second Exercise

Women's Pair

Overall

First Exercise

Second Exercise

References

Acrobatic Gymnastics Championships
Acrobatic Gymnastics World Championships
International gymnastics competitions hosted by Poland
1980 in Polish sport